The Hex River Mountains make up the second highest mountain range in the Western Cape province of South Africa and are located  north-east of Cape Town. They form part of a large anticline in the Cape Fold Belt mountain system and form a north-east, south-west trending mountain system forming the core of the Cape Syntaxis between the towns of Worcester and De Doorns. They are mostly composed of Table Mountain sandstone and most peaks reach  in height or more.

The vegetation is primarily montane fynbos and the mountains fall within the Cape's Mediterranean climate. The mountains provide some rudimentary snow-skiing opportunities in winter, with the Western Cape's heaviest snowfalls occurring in and around these ranges. The surrounding valleys support intensive deciduous fruit cultivation, mostly in the form of cherries and table grapes.

Block streams and terraces found in the near the summit of Matroosberg evidences past periglacial activity, which occurred likely during the Last Glacial Maximum.

See also

References

External links
 Hex River Valley tourism

Mountain ranges of the Western Cape